Asterivora inspoliata is a species of moth in the family Choreutidae. It is endemic to New Zealand and has been found in the southern parts of the South Island. Adults are on the wing in December and January.

Taxonomy 

In 1939 George Hudson discussed and illustrated this species under that name. In 1979 J. S. Dugdale placed this species within the genus Asterivora. In 1988 Dugdale confirmed this placement. The male holotype specimen, collected at Flat Mountain, is held at the Auckland War Memorial Museum.

Description 

Philpott described this species as follows:

Distribution
This species is endemic to New Zealand and has been found in subalpine habitat in the hills and mountains of Otago, Fiordland and Southland.

Behaviour 
Adults of this species are on the wing in December and January.

References

Asterivora
Moths of New Zealand
Endemic fauna of New Zealand
Moths described in 1930
Taxa named by Alfred Philpott
Endemic moths of New Zealand